El Pueblo (The People) was a Spanish daily newspaper, the central organ of the Syndicalist Party during the 1930s. The paper had its headquarters in Valencia. It had a moderate republican political stance.

References

Defunct newspapers published in Spain
Mass media in Valencia
Daily newspapers published in Spain
Publications with year of establishment missing
Spanish-language newspapers